English ska revival band the Specials recorded nine studio albums, one collaboration album, five live albums, eleven compilation albums, four extended plays, twenty-three singles, and filmed five videos.

Albums

Studio albums

Collaboration albums

Live albums

Compilation albums

EPs

Singles

Compilation contributions

Videography
 "Dance Craze – The Best of British Ska... Live!" (VHS)
 "The Special AKA on Film" (1981 VHS & Laserdisc)
 "The Specials: Too Much, Too Young" (2008 DVD)
 "The Best of the Specials" (CD/DVD 2008)
 "The Specials – 30th Anniversary Tour" (2009 DVD)

Films
Sixteen Candles (1984) – song – "Little Bitch"
Natural Born Killers (1994) – song – "Ghost Town" (not included on the soundtrack album)
Multiplicity (1996) – song – "A Little Bit Me, A Little Bit You"
Grosse Pointe Blank (1997) – songs – "Pressure Drop", "A Message to You, Rudy" and "You're Wondering Now"
SLC Punk! (1998) – songs – "Too Hot" and "Gangsters"
200 Cigarettes (1999) – song – "A Message to You, Rudy"
Mystery Men (1999) – song – "Gangsters" (covered by Citizen King)
A Room for Romeo Brass (1999) – song – "A Message to You, Rudy"
An Extremely Goofy Movie (2000) – song – "Pressure Drop"
Snatch (2000) – song – "Ghost Town"
Garage Days (2002) – song – "Ghost Town"
Shaun of the Dead (2004) – song – "Ghost Town"
This Is England (2006) – songs – "Do the Dog", "Pressure Drop"
We Own The Night (2007) – song – "A Message to You, Rudy"
 Vivarium (2019) – song – "A Message to You, Rudy"

Television
Father Ted – Episode – Think Fast, Father Ted – song – "Ghost Town"
Six Feet Under – song – "Monkey Man"
Misfits (TV series) – song – "A Message to You Rudy"

Commercials
The song "A Message to You, Rudy" was featured in a SFR television commercial directed by Bruno Aveillan, with world champion football player, Marcel Desailly in 2001
The song "Blank Expression" was featured in a Ford Fiesta television commercial in 2003

Video games
Dance Dance Revolution – song – "Little Bitch" (remix)
MLB 2K7 – Song – "A Message To You, Rudy"
Skate 2 – Song – "Ghost Town"

Notes

References

Rock music group discographies
New wave discographies
Discographies of British artists
Discography